Tukaka "Kaka" George Tamarua Ama is a Cook Islands politician and member of the Cook Islands Parliament.  He is a member of the Cook Islands Party.

Ama is from Ngatangiia on Rarotonga. He previously worked as a public servant for the Ministry of Foreign Affairs and Immigration.

He stood for election at the 2018 Cook Islands general election as a Cook Islands Party candidate, losing to the Democrats' Tamaiva Tuavera. As a candidate he advocated for higher wages and lower interest rates. He stood again at the 2022 Cook Islands general election and was elected.

References

Living people
 People from Rarotonga
Cook Island civil servants
Members of the Parliament of the Cook Islands
Cook Islands Party politicians
Year of birth missing (living people)